The 2023 USL Championship season is currently the 13th season of the USL Championship and the seventh season under Division II sanctioning.  The 2023 season will have 24 teams participating in two conferences during the regular season. San Antonio FC are the defending champions.

Teams

Changes from 2022
Joined MLS Next Pro
 Atlanta United 2
 LA Galaxy II
 New York Red Bulls II

Stadiums and locations

Personnel and sponsorships

Managerial changes

Regular season

Format
The teams will play a balanced 34-game schedule. Each team will play their conference opponents twice, and play one game each with the teams in the opposite conference. The top 8 teams in each conference will make the playoffs.

Eastern Conference

Western Conference

Results table

Regular season statistical leaders

Top scorers

Hat-tricks

Notes
(H) – Home team(A) – Away team

Top assists

Clean sheets

League awards

Weekly awards

References

	

 
2023
2023 in American soccer leagues